
Variety Jones is a restaurant in Dublin, Ireland.

History
Opened in December 2018 by head chef Keelan Higgs and his brother Aaron, the restaurant takes its name from Variety Jones (Roger Thomas Clark), one of the founders of the online market Silk Road; Higgs' brother Aaron once worked in a Thailand bar that belonged to Clark. It is located in The Liberties, across from John's Lane Church. Variety Jones received a Michelin star in the 2020 Michelin Guide Great Britain & Ireland.

Awards
 Michelin star: since 2019

See also
List of Michelin starred restaurants in Ireland

References

External links
Official Site

Restaurants in Dublin (city)
Michelin Guide starred restaurants in Ireland
Irish companies established in 2018